Dexter Curtis (September 12, 1828 – May 15, 1898) was an American inventor, businessman, and politician.

Born in Schenectady, New York, Curtis grew up on a farm. He was in the lumber business and lived in Louisiana, Michigan, and Chicago, Illinois. In 1866, Curtis moved to the town of Burke, Dane County, Wisconsin and was a farmer. Curtis invented and patented the Curtis zinc horse-collar pad. The factory for the horse-collar pads was located in Madison, Wisconsin. He also operated a dry goods business. Curtis served on the Madison Common Council and was a Democrat. In 1883, Curtis served in the Wisconsin State Senate from Madison, Wisconsin. Curtis died in Madison, Wisconsin from a heart attack ("apoplexy of the heart").

Notes

External links

1828 births
1898 deaths
Politicians from Schenectady, New York
Politicians from Madison, Wisconsin
Businesspeople from Madison, Wisconsin
Farmers from New York (state)
Farmers from Wisconsin
19th-century American inventors
Wisconsin city council members
19th-century American politicians
Businesspeople from Schenectady, New York
People from Burke, Wisconsin
Democratic Party members of the Wisconsin State Assembly